Sulitjelma Mines was a Norwegian mining company that extracted copper, pyrite, and zinc at Sulitjelma in the municipality of Fauske, Norway. Operations started with a test mine in 1887. From 1891 to 1933, the business was registered as a Swedish company called Sulitelma Aktiebolags Gruber. From 1933 to 1983, it was registered as a Norwegian company called A/S Sulitjelma Gruber, and from 1983 until it was shut down in 1991 the company was state-owned and was named Sulitjelma Bergverk AS.

Chalcopyrite was found by the Sami Mons Andreas Petersen around 1858, but due to the very remote location of the place there was skepticism that the deposits could be commercially viable. It was only when the Swedish industrialist and consul Nils Persson gained interest in the ore deposits in 1886 that progress was made in developing mining in Sulitelma. The company Sulitelma Aktiebolags Gruber was founded in 1891. That same year, the narrow-gauge Sulitjelma Line was built. Until 1956, copper and semi-finished products were transported by train and steamship to the port at Finneid. Transport was an expensive part of the operations throughout the history of the mining company.

Several technical innovations and inventions were made at Sulitjelma, including the Knudsen process and some of the world's first electric copper smelters. Later in the history of the works many other improvements were made, especially in concentrating ore and smelting. In the early 1900s, Sulitjelma Mines was the second-largest industrial company in Norway.

Sulitjelma was initially an isolated mountain village inhabited by pioneer settlers, but the population increased rapidly in pace with mining, from about 50 around 1890 to almost 3,000 in 1910. The living conditions for the workers were very primitive, and the work conditions were difficult and hazardous to health. The class differences between workers, foremen, and officials were noticeable. After the large-scale assembly on the ice of Long Lake (Langvatnet) on January 13, 1907, when the first labor association was founded, conditions gradually improved.

During the Second World War, Sulitjelma Mines was considered to be so important for the German war industry that production had to be maintained at all costs. Although the Gestapo knew that employees were engaged in illegal activities, they failed to intervene because they feared that the arrest of key personnel would impact production.

The upswing after the Second World War turned to uncertainty when copper prices fell sharply in 1975. The weakened profitability that followed led to economizing operations and dismissals. Then there was also a need for large investments in the old plant. Among other things, pollution from the smelting hut had become an increasing problem that could only be solved with a costly treatment plant. Remedial measures were taken, but these were subsequently considered unsuccessful. Mining ceased in 1991.

In its approximately 100 years of operation, six million tons of metal and sulfur were extracted. Most of this was sulfur. The remainder was 0.47 million tons of copper, 215 tons of zinc, 282 tons of silver, and 3.7 tons of gold.

References

Fauske
Mining companies of Norway
1991 disestablishments in Norway
Norwegian companies established in 1887